Woodgate is a coastal locality in the Bundaberg Region, Queensland, Australia. In the  Woodgate had a population of 1,165 people.

There are two towns within the locality, Woodgate Beach on the eastern coast of the locality (the Coral Sea) and Walkers Point on the southern coast of locality (in the estuary of the Burrum River).

Geography 

The majority of the coastline of Woodgate consists of sandy beach, making it a popular holiday destination for people who live in nearby areas of Queensland. This small seaside town called Woodgate Beach with 16 km of white sandy beach with crystal clear peaceful, safe, sub tropical water is surrounded by a 20,000 hectare National Park with superb scenery, and provides a diverse range of holiday activities.

On the inland side of Woodgate lies Burrum Coast National Park.  The beach itself is quite calm, being protected by Fraser Island.

History 
The Kabi group Dundaburra are traditionally connected to the area.

Woodgate State School opened on 1921 and closed in 1922.

The Woodgate Beach public library opened in 1993 with a minor refurbishment in 2009.

In the  Woodgate had a population of 1,165 people.

Education 
There are no schools in Woodgate. The nearest government primary school is Goodwood State School in neighbouring Goodwood to the west. The nearest government secondary school is Isis District State High School in Childers to the south-west.

Amenities 
The Bundaberg Regional Council operates a public library in the Community Centre at 1 Kangaroo Court.

There is a boat ramp on the north bank of the inlet of Hervey Bay where the confluence of the Gregory River and Burrum River reaches the sea . It is managed by the Bundaberg Regional Council.

References

External links
 

Bundaberg Region
Coastline of Queensland
Localities in Queensland